The World Association Training scheme was a Girl Guiding activity after World War II. Mona Burgin was the leader of the first team briefed to find and support Guides living in displaced persons' camps. After the team's first tour of duty, General Sir Evelyn Fanshawe, at that time in charge of the United Nations Relief and Rehabilitation Administration relief operation in the then British Zone of occupied Germany, "remarked that, in his opinion, Scouting and Guiding were the most rehabilitative factors at work in the camps at that time." Elizabeth Hartley followed Burgin as leader of the team.

References

International Scouting
Exile organizations
Displaced persons camps in the aftermath of World War II